is a passenger railway station in located in the city of Suzuka,  Mie Prefecture, Japan, operated by the private railway operator Kintetsu Railway.

Lines
Chiyozaki Station is served by the Nagoya Line, and is located 50.1 rail kilometers from the starting point of the line at Kintetsu Nagoya Station.

Station layout
The station was consists of two opposed side platforms, connected by a level crossing. The station is unattended.

Platforms

Adjacent stations

History
Chiyozaki Station opened on January 12, 1916 as a station on the Ise Railway. The Ise Railway became the Sangu Express Electric Railway’s Ise Line on September 15, 1936, and was renamed the Nagoya Line on December 7, 1938. After merging with Osaka Electric Kido on March 15, 1941, the line became the Kansai Express Railway's Nagoya Line. This line was merged with the Nankai Electric Railway on June 1, 1944 to form Kintetsu.

Passenger statistics
In fiscal 2019, the station was used by an average of 1367 passengers daily (boarding passengers only).

Surrounding area
Mie Prefectural Road No. 6 Yokkaichi Kusunoki Suzuka Line
Mie Prefectural Road 507 Chiyozaki Port Line
Chiyozaki beach
Suzuka University of Medical Science

See also
List of railway stations in Japan

References

External links

 Kintetsu: Chiyozaki Station

Railway stations in Japan opened in 1916
Railway stations in Mie Prefecture
Stations of Kintetsu Railway
Suzuka, Mie